The 2015 China League One is the 12th season of the China League One, the second tier of the Chinese football league pyramid, since its establishment in 2004. The league title sponsor is 58.com.

Teams 
A total of 16 teams will contest the league, including 11 sides from the 2014 season, two relegated from the 2014 Chinese Super League and three promoted from the 2014 China League Two.

Team changes

To League One 

Teams relegated from 2014 Chinese Super League
 Dalian Aerbin
 Harbin Yiteng

Teams promoted from 2014 China League Two
 Jiangxi Liansheng 
 Taiyuan Zhongyou Jiayi
 Guizhou Zhicheng

From League One 
Teams promoted to 2015 Chinese Super League
 Chongqing Lifan 
 Shijiazhuang Yongchang

Dissolved entries
 Shenyang Zhongze
 Shaanxi Wuzhou（Guangdong Sunray Cave）

Teams relegated to 2015 China League Two and Dissolved entries
 Chengdu Tiancheng

Name changes 
 Guangdong Sunray Cave F.C. moved to the city of Xi'an and changed their name to Shaanxi Wuzhou F.C. in December 2014. 
 Beijing Baxy F.C. changed their name to Beijing Enterprises Group F.C. in December 2014.
 Taiyuan Zhongyou Jiayi F.C. moved to the city of Hohhot and changed their name to Nei Mongol Zhongyou F.C. in January 2015.
 Shenzhen Ruby F.C. changed their name to Shenzhen F.C. in January 2015.

Clubs

Stadiums and Locations

Managerial changes

Foreign players
Restricting the number of foreign players strictly to three per CL1 team.
A team could use three foreign players on the field each game. Outfield players came from Hong Kong, Macau and Chinese Taipei were deemed as native players (doesn't count on the foreign player slot) in CL1.

Foreign players who left their clubs after first half of the season.

Hong Kong/Macau/Taiwan outfield players:

League table

Results

Positions by round

Goalscorers

Top scorers
{| class="wikitable"
|-
!Rank
!Player
!Club
!Total
|-
!rowspan=1|
| Ha Tae-goon
|Yanbian Changbaishan
|
|-
!rowspan=1|
| Cristian Dănălache
|Xinjiang Tianshan Leopard
|
|-
!rowspan=2|
| Bruno Meneghel
|Dalian Aerbin
|
|-
| Andrés Márquez
|Beijing BIT
|
|-
!rowspan=1|
| Yves Ekwalla Herman
|Guizhou Zhicheng
|
|-
!rowspan=1|
|  Bubacarr Trawally
| Yanbian Changbaishan
|
|-
!rowspan=1|
|  Carmelo Valencia
| Beijing Enterprises Group
|
|-
!rowspan=3|
| Brice Jovial
|Wuhan Zall
|
|-
|  Danko Lazović
| Beijing Enterprises Group
|
|-
| Nenad Milijaš
|Hebei Zhongji
|
|-

Hat-tricks

Awards
The awards of 2015 China League One were announced on 3 November 2015.
 Most valuable player:  Ha Tae-goon (Yanbian Changbaishan)
 Top scorer:  Ha Tae-goon (Yanbian Changbaishan)
 Best goalkeeper:  Chi Wenyi (Yanbian Changbaishan)
 Best coach:  Park Tae-ha (Yanbian Changbaishan)

League Attendance

†

†

References

External links 
  
China League One at sina.com 
China League One at sohu.com 
China League One at qq.com 

China League One seasons
2
China
China